Konechnaya is a rural locality (a village) in Beketovskoye Rural Settlement, Vozhegodsky District, Vologda Oblast, Russia. The population was 2 as of 2002.

Geography 
The distance to Vozhega is 81.5 km, to Beketovskaya is 25 km. Mytnik, Tigino, Pokrovskaya, Zuyevo, Kuritsino, Filatovskaya, Strokavino are the nearest rural localities.

References 

Rural localities in Vozhegodsky District